Kill Memory Crash is an Electronic band from Chicago, Illinois. They originally formed around 1998 as a duo (Alex SanFaçon and Adam Sieczka), and made an almost self-imposed exile from the music industry due to their indifferences to the popular styles of Electronic music at the time. Kill Memory Crash eventually became known for their subversive lyrical themes and dark musical style, blurring the boundaries between industrial, techno, electro, pop, and rock.

They signed with Ghostly International in 2002 and released their first full-length album "American Automatic" in 2005 (the follow-up to their mini-LP, "When The Blood Turns Black"). In 2008 they were joined by live percussionist (and DJ) Gabriel Palomo of Zuvuya Recordings, who was introduced to them through a mutual friend. Kill Memory Crash continues to perform at select international venues/events and is rumored to be working on new material for 2013.

Discography

Albums
When The Blood Turns Black – 2002 (Ghostly International)
Crash V8 – 2005 (Ghostly International)
American Automatic – 2005 (Ghostly International)
Of Fire – 2008 (Ghostly International)

Remixes
Never Forget/Technasty RMX – 2004 (Ghostly International/Spectral Sound)
"List Of Demands (Reparations) (Kill Memory Crash Remix)" - 2004 (Wichita)
The O – 2005 (Ghostly International/Spectral Sound)
"Crash V8" - 2005 (Ghostly International/Spectral Sound)
"Binary Nation (Demento Mix)" - 2006 (Invisible, Underground, Inc.)
"Eyes Like Knives (written by Kill Memory Crash & Franz + Shape)" - 2007 (Relish Recordings)

Compilation Appearances
Idol Tryouts: Ghostly International Vol. 1 – 2003 (Ghostly International) – "Get Out"
Idol Tryouts: Ghostly International Vol. 2 – 2006 (Ghostly International) – "Press + Burn"
Ghostly Swim – 2008 (Ghostly International/Williams Street Records) – "Hit + Run"

Members
Alex SanFaçon - Electronics & Production
Adam Killing - Synths & Vocals 
Gabriel Palomo - Live Percussion

External links
Official Website
Official MySpace
Kill Memory Crash at Ghostly International

Electronic music groups from Illinois
Musical groups from Chicago
Underground, Inc. artists
Ghostly International artists